Mujahid Yusof Rawa (Jawi: مجاهد بن يوسف; born 25 October 1964), is a Malaysian politician who served as the Minister in the Prime Minister's Department in charge of Religious Affairs in the Pakatan Harapan (PH) administration under former Prime Minister Mahathir Mohamad from July 2018 to the collapse of the PH administration in February 2020. He has served as the Member of Parliament (MP) for Parit Buntar since March 2008. He is a member of the National Trust Party (AMANAH), a component party of the PH opposition coalition and was a member of the Malaysian Islamic Party (PAS), a component party of the ruling Perikatan Nasional (PN) coalition and formerly Pakatan Rakyat (PR) coalition.

Mujahid is the son of former president of PAS, Yusof Rawa and has a PhD in political science. Rawa being a progressive party leader has spoken of transforming PAS, an Islamic party, into a multi-racial party. But he together with a few other progressive leaders referred as G18 was ousted at the 2015 PAS Muktamar and has launched Gerakan Harapan Baru (GHB) that founded the new AMANAH party later in 2015.

Mujahid made his debut contesting the parliamentary seat of Jasin, Malacca in the 1999 general election but lost. In the 2004 general election he stood but was defeated for the Tasek Gelugor constituency in Penang.

Mujahid was elected to Parliament in the 2008 general election, winning the seat of Parit Buntar in Perak. During the 2013 general election, he won and reelected as the candidate of PAS of the Pakatan Rakyat (PR) opposition coalition. In 2018 general election, he retained the seat as AMANAH candidate with Pakatan Harapan coalition. Subsequently, on 2 July 2018, he was appointed as Minister in the Prime Minister's Department for Religious Affairs.

In 2019, he was criticised by Western media for his support for Xinjiang anti-extremism policies. On 26 June 2019, on a 7-day visit to Xinjiang as Malaysia's Religious Affairs Minister, he confirmed in a Facebook post that the camps were indeed vocational and training institutions. The next day, on 27 June, he made a speech at the Beijing Foreign Studies University in which he said "false news in China about Muslims being oppressed could trigger a wave of sympathy to the oppressed and affect relationships".

Election results

Honours
  :
  Officer of the Order of the Defender of State (DSPN) – Dato' (2012)
  :
  Grand Commander of the Order of Malacca (DGSM) – Datuk Seri (2018)

See also
 Parit Buntar (federal constituency)

References

External links
 

Living people
1964 births
People from Penang
Malaysian people of Malay descent
Malaysian people of Minangkabau descent
Malaysian Muslims
National Trust Party (Malaysia) politicians
Former Malaysian Islamic Party politicians
Members of the Dewan Rakyat
Government ministers of Malaysia
University of Putra Malaysia alumni
21st-century Malaysian politicians